Owen Joseph Kline (born October 14, 1991) is an American filmmaker and actor. He is best known for his directorial debut Funny Pages (2022) and his performance as Frank Berkman in The Squid and the Whale (2005).

Early life
Kline was born and raised in New York City, to actor Kevin Kline and actress Phoebe Cates. He has one younger sister, Greta Kline, a musician/singer-songwriter. At age 7, he fell ill, and during a two-week stay in the hospital was diagnosed with Type 1 diabetes. He acted in his adolescence in the independent films The Anniversary Party (2001) and Noah Baumbach’s The Squid and The Whale (2005), but did not pursue a subsequent career in acting, instead remaining in junior high school. He performed in provocative novelty bands in high school, released prank call CDs, and created xeroxed comics, joke books and zines. He attended Pratt Institute in Brooklyn, New York, studying illustration and film.

He worked as an assistant to the archivist at New York film museum Anthology Film Archives, and for musicologists Billy Miller and Miriam Linna at their Norton label and Kicks Books imprint. He crewed on early work of filmmakers Josh and Benny Safdie, and acted in their film John's Gone (2010), and in Michael M. Bilandic's film Jobe'z World (2018).

Work
In 2013 Kline wrote and directed the short comedy Fowl Play, about a group of low-rent criminals fooled into buying a hen for a cockfight in Flushing, Queens. He co-wrote and directed the short film Jazzy for Joe (2014), a narrative comedy about, and starring, New York broadcaster Joe Franklin raising an abandoned baby, which premiered at BAMcinemaFest 2015.

Kline spent six years continually writing, directing and editing his debut feature Funny Pages, a black comedy about a young dropout cartoonist striking out on his own in Trenton, New Jersey. Produced by the Safdie Brothers and distributed by A24, it premiered in the Director's Fortnight at the 75th Cannes Film Festival in 2022.

Prior to Funny Pages, Kline provided research for books, including Mark Newgarden and Paul Karasik's How to Read Nancy. In 2011, Kline's one-shot comic book, Whippers & Snappers, featured early incarnations of Funny Pages characters in a story called "Robert in the Boiler Room".

In 2021, Kline contributed a two-page comic about Our Gang star Norman "Chubby" Chaney to film critic Nick Pinkerton's premiere issue of Bombast: A Journal of Film & Funnies.

Filmography

References

1991 births
Living people
Filmmakers from New York (state)
American cartoonists
American male film actors
Film directors from New York City
American documentary film directors
American writers of Chinese descent
American writers of Filipino descent
American people of German-Jewish descent
American people of Irish descent
American people of Russian-Jewish descent